The Birthplace of Patrick Henry (1736–1799), the Founding Father and American statesman from Virginia, was a farmhouse called "Studley", located in what is now the village of Studley in Hanover County, Virginia.  The house, a two-story brick structure, was built in the 1720s by John Symes, whose wife Sarah married Patrick Henry's father John after Symes died.  Patrick Henry was born in the house on May 29, 1736.  By 1796 the farmstead included a significant number of outbuildings.  The house was destroyed by fire in 1807, and now only archaeological remnants remain.

There is an interpretive plaque near the site at 9620 Studley Farms Drive.  The site was listed on the National Register of Historic Places in 1982.

See also
 National Register of Historic Places listings in Hanover County, Virginia
 Pine Slash
 Scotchtown plantation
 Leatherwood Plantation
 Red Hill Patrick Henry National Memorial

References

Archaeological sites on the National Register of Historic Places in Virginia
National Register of Historic Places in Hanover County, Virginia
Hanover County, Virginia
Patrick Henry
Henry, Patrick
Homes of United States Founding Fathers